Nalin Priyadarshana (born 28 August 1990) is a Sri Lankan cricketer. He made his first-class debut for Colombo Cricket Club in the 2015–16 Premier League Tournament on 4 December 2015.

He made his Twenty20 debut for Sri Lanka Ports Authority Cricket Club in the 2017–18 SLC Twenty20 Tournament on 1 March 2018, taking a hat-trick. He made his List A debut for Sri Lanka Ports Authority Cricket Club in the 2017–18 Premier Limited Overs Tournament on 18 March 2018.

In November 2021, he was selected to play for the Colombo Stars following the players' draft for the 2021 Lanka Premier League.

References

External links
 

1990 births
Living people
Sri Lankan cricketers
Colombo Cricket Club cricketers
Sri Lanka Police Sports Club cricketers
Seeduwa Raddoluwa Cricket Club cricketers
Sri Lanka Army Sports Club cricketers
Sri Lanka Ports Authority Cricket Club cricketers
People from Colombo District